Daniel Huntington may refer to:

Daniel Huntington (artist) (1816–1906), American artist
Daniel Huntington (bishop) (1868–?), American missionary to China
Daniel Riggs Huntington (1871–1962), American architect